Broken Brights is the second studio album by Angus Stone, released in July 2012. The album peaked at number 2 in Australia and was certified gold. 

At the ARIA Music Awards of 2012, the album was nominated for ARIA Award for Best Male Artist and ARIA Award for Best Blues and Roots Album.

Track listing

Charts

Weekly charts

Year-end charts

Certifications

References

2012 albums
Angus Stone albums